Wolfgang Amadeus Mozart's Violin Sonata No. 23 in D Major, K. 306, was completed in 1778 in Paris.

The sonata contains three movements:

(Some sources and scores list the second movement as Andante cantabile.)

References

23
1778 compositions
Compositions in D major